This is a list of amphibians of South Australia. They are all frogs.

Order Anura (frogs and toads)
Cyclorana cultripes (knife-footed frog)
Limnodynastes dumerilii (eastern banjo frog)
Limnodynastes fletcheri (barking marsh frog)
Limnodynastes peronii (striped marsh frog)
Limnodynastes tasmaniensis (spotted marsh frog)
Neobatrachus sudellae (Sudell's frog)
Neobatrachus pictus (painted burrowing frog)
Neobatrachus sutor (shoemaker frog)
Notaden nichollsi (desert spadefoot toad)

Family Hylidae (treefrogs) 
Litoria ewingi (southern brown tree frog)
Litoria latopalmata (broad-palmed frog)
Litoria peronii (Peron's tree frog)
Litoria rubella (desert tree frog)
Ranoidea caerulea (Australian green tree frog)
Ranoidea maini (Main's frog)
Ranoidea platycephala (water-holding frog)
Ranoidea raniformis (growling grass frog)

Family Myobatrachidae (Australian ground frogs)
Crinia deserticola (desert froglet)
Crinia parinsignifera (eastern sign-bearing froglet)
Crinia riparia (streambank froglet)
Crinia signifera (common eastern froglet)
Geocrinia laevis (southern smooth froglet)
Opisthodon spenceri (Spencer's burrowing frog)
Pseudophryne bibronii (Bibron's toadlet)
Pseudophryne occidentalis (orange-crowned toadlet)
Pseudophryne semimarmorata (southern toadlet)
Uperoleia rugosa (wrinkled toadlet)

Sources
https://web.archive.org/web/20080426171922/http://www.epa.sa.gov.au/frogcensus/sa_frogs.html
http://frogs.org.au/frogs/of/South_Australia/

 
Amphibians of South Australia
Amphibians
South Australia